Miss USA 2004 was the 53rd Miss USA pageant, held at the Dolby Theatre in Hollywood, California on April 12, 2004. The winner of the beauty pageant was Shandi Finnessey, who became the first winner from the state of Missouri. Finnessey was crowned by outgoing Miss USA Susie Castillo, of Massachusetts.

The pageant was hosted by Billy Bush and Nancy O'Dell, the first time this partnership had hosted the pageant.  Bush had previously hosted Miss USA 2003 and Miss Universe 2003.

For the first time since 1970, fifteen semi-finalists competed in the final competition, although not all the semi-finalists competed in both the swimsuit and evening gown.  Following the new format established at Miss Universe 2003 and Miss Teen USA 2003, the top fifteen semi-finalists were reduced to ten after the evening gown competition, and then to the final five after swimsuits.  This was the first time that contestants did not have the opportunity to compete in both competitions. This was also for the first time since 1979 that the pageant took place in the month of April.

Results

Placements

Special awards

Delegates

The Miss USA 2004 delegates were:

 Alabama – Tara Darby
 Alaska – Cari Leyva
 Arizona – Danielle Demski
 Arkansas – Jennifer Sherrill
 California – Ellen Chapman
 Colorado – Janel Haw
 Connecticut – Sheila Wiatr
 Delaware – Courtney Purdy
 District of Columbia – Tiara Christen Dews
 Florida – Kristen Berset
 Georgia – Caroline Medley
 Hawaii – Justine Michioka
 Idaho – Kimberly Glyn Weible
 Illinois – Molly Graham
 Indiana – Stephanie "Steffi" Keusch
 Iowa – Brooke Hansen
 Kansas – Lisa Forbes
 Kentucky – Lauren Stengel
 Louisiana – Melissa McConnell
 Maine – Mackenzie Davis
 Maryland – Tia Shorts
 Massachusetts – Maria Lekkakos
 Michigan – Stacey Lee
 Minnesota – Jessica Dereschuk
 Mississippi – Beth Richards
 Missouri – Shandi Finnessey
 Montana – Molly Flynn
 Nebraska – Guerin Austin
 Nevada – Victoria Franklin
 New Hampshire – Vanessa Bissanti
 New Jersey – Janaye Ingram
 New Mexico – Jenna Hardin
 New York –  Jaclyn Nesheiwat
 North Carolina – Ashley Puleo
 North Dakota – Jennifer Smith
 Ohio – Lauren Kelsey Hall
 Oklahoma – Lindsay Hill
 Oregon – Jennifer Murphy
 Pennsylvania – Nicole Georghalli
 Rhode Island – Sarah Rose Bettencourt
 South Carolina –  Amanda Pennekamp
 South Dakota – Andrea Parliament
 Tennessee – Stephanie Culberson
 Texas – Stephanie Guerrero
 Utah – Kyla Faye Dickerson
 Vermont – Michelle Fongemie
 Virginia – Kristi Lauren Glakas
 Washington – Tara McCormick
 West Virginia – Carolyn Jennings
 Wisconsin – Jenna Shultz
 Wyoming – Katie Rudoff

Historical significance 
 Missouri wins competition for the first time and surpasses its previous highest placement from 1998. Also becoming in the 28th state who does it for the first time.
 South Carolina earns the 1st runner-up position for the fifth time. The last time it placed this was in 1990. Also had its highest placement since Lu Parker won Miss USA 1994. 
 North Carolina earns the 2nd runner-up position for the third time. The last time it placed this was in 1994. Besides had its best finish in 10 years.
 Oklahoma earns the 3rd runner-up position for the first time. Also had its best finish in the pageant since 1989.
 Tennessee earns the 4th runner-up position for the second time and repeats the same position as the past year 2003.
 States that placed in semifinals the previous year were Alabama, New Mexico, Oklahoma, South Carolina, Tennessee and Texas.
 Texas placed for the fourth consecutive year.
 Alabama and South Carolina placed for the third consecutive year. 
 New Mexico, Oklahoma and Tennessee made their second consecutive placement.
 Georgia, Missouri and Oregon last placed in 2001.
 New Hampshire last placed in 2000.
 Arizona and Washington last placed in 1998.
 North Carolina last placed in 1994.
 Florida and Idaho last placed in 1997.
 Indiana breaks an ongoing streak of placements since 2002.

Contestant notes

Kristi Lauren Glakas (Virginia) had previously held the title Miss Virginia Teen USA 1999 (semi-finalist at Miss Teen USA 1999) and would later become Miss Virginia 2005 (3rd runner-up at Miss America 2006).  She is one of six triple crown winners.
Other delegates who had previously or would later hold Miss America state titles
Shandi Finnessey (Missouri) – Miss Missouri 2002
Stephanie Culberson (Tennessee) – (4th runner-up), Miss Tennessee 2001 (2nd runner-up)
Cari Leyva (Alaska) – Miss Alaska 2007
Delegates who had previously competed at Miss Teen USA were:
Danielle Demski (Arizona) – Miss Arizona Teen USA 1999 (finalist at Miss Teen USA 1999)
Tiara Dews (District of Columbia) – Miss District of Columbia Teen USA 2000 (semi-finalist at Miss Teen USA 2000)
Kimberly Weible (Idaho) – Miss Idaho Teen USA 1999
Victoria Franklin (Nevada) – Miss Nevada Teen USA 1998 (second runner-up at Miss Teen USA 1998)
Katie Rudoff (Wyoming) – Miss Wyoming Teen USA 1999
Jennifer Murphy (Oregon) later appeared on Donald Trump's reality television show The Apprentice 4
Jaclyn Nesheiwat (New York) later married Creed drummer Scott Stapp
Mackenzie Davis (Maine) became director of the Miss Maine USA and Miss Maine Teen USA pageants in 2006.
 It was the first time since 1984 where two of the top 5 finalists were former Miss America state titleholders. In 1984, the top 3 were all former Miss America state titleholders.
Later on two delegates went on to win the Miss Earth USA title. The first was Amanda Pennekamp, Miss South Carolina USA who won the Miss Earth USA 2006 title and was a top 16 semifinalist at Miss Earth 2006. The second was Miss Kansas USA, Lisa Forbes who won the 2007 title and competed at Miss Earth 2007.

Judges
BD Wong – Actor
Jerry Buss – Majority owner of the Los Angeles Lakers
Rocco DiSpirito – Chef
Jeff Gordon – Professional stock car racing driver
Vanessa Haydon – Socialite, actress and model
Tricia Helfer – Actress and model
John Salley – Former professional basketball player, talk show host and actor
Mekhi Phifer – Actor
Liza Huber – Television actress
Brandi Sherwood – Miss Teen USA 1989 and Miss USA 1997
Jill Stuart – Fashion designer

Related competitions
For the second year, there was a Miss USA Fear Factor special, in which Tara Darby of Alabama won the $50,000 prize (half of which to be donated to the charity of her choice).

External links
Miss USA Magic's Miss USA 2004 coverage
Official Miss USA site 

2004
April 2004 events in the United States
2004 beauty pageants
2004 in California
Beauty pageants in the United States